Checupa fortissima is a species of moth of the family Noctuidae. It is found in the north-eastern Himalaya.

References

Moths described in 1867
Hadeninae